Pilot Peak is an  elevation glaciated summit located  northwest of Valdez in the Chugach Mountains of the U.S. state of Alaska. The mountain was so named in 1955 by Lawrence E. Nielsen "because it is a very distinctive landmark that helped guide us back to camp in our explorations during 1955." Nielsen was leader of the Chugach Mountains Expedition which was sponsored by the Arctic Institute of North America. This name was officially adopted by the U.S. Board on Geographic Names in 1965.

Climate

Based on the Köppen climate classification, Pilot Peak is located in a subarctic climate zone with long, cold, snowy winters, and cool summers. Weather systems coming off the Gulf of Alaska are forced upwards by the Chugach Mountains (orographic lift), causing heavy precipitation in the form of rainfall and snowfall. Temperatures can drop below −20 °C with wind chill factors below −30 °C. This climate supports the Columbia Glacier surrounding this mountain. The months May through June offer the most favorable weather for climbing.

See also

List of mountain peaks of Alaska
Geography of Alaska

References

Gallery

External links
 Weather: Pilot Peak

Mountains of Alaska
Landforms of Copper River Census Area, Alaska
North American 2000 m summits